Kunów may refer to the following places in Poland:
Kunów, a town in Świętokrzyskie Voivodeship (south-central Poland)
Kunów, Wrocław County in Lower Silesian Voivodeship (south-west Poland)
Kunów, Zgorzelec County in Lower Silesian Voivodeship (south-west Poland)
Kunów, Lesser Poland Voivodeship (south Poland)
Kunów, Lubartów County (southeast Poland)